Muzayraa (Mzera'a or Mazirah) is a town in northwestern Syria administratively part of the Latakia Governorate, located east of Latakia. Nearby localities include Difa and Hanadi to the west, al-Jandiriyah to the northwest, al-Haffah and Ayn al-Tineh to the north, Slinfah to the northeast, Shathah to the east and Qardaha to the south. According to the Syria Central Bureau of Statistics (CBS), Muzayraa had a population was 834 in the 2004 census. It is the administrative center and the fourth largest locality of the Muzayraa nahiyah ("subdistrict") which contained 27 localities with a collective population of 13,908 in 2004. Its inhabitants predominantly Christians.

References

Bibliography

Muzayraa
Muzayraa
Muzayraa